Sian James may refer to:

Siân James (novelist) (born 1930), Welsh author
Siân James (politician) (born 1959), Welsh Labour Member of Parliament
Siân James (musician) (born 1961), Welsh traditional folk singer and harpist

See also
Sean James (born 1969), American football player
James (surname)